Starkenburg is an historical region in the State of Hesse, Germany, comprising the area south of the Main River and east of the Rhine, around the regional capital Darmstadt.

Geography

The region is named after Starkenburg Castle, above Heppenheim on the historic Bergstraße Route. Beside the cities of Darmstadt and Offenbach, it consists of the modern districts (kreise):
 Bergstraße
 Darmstadt-Dieburg
 Groß-Gerau
 Odenwaldkreis
 Offenbach

History

Starkenburg Castle was erected about 1065 to protect the estates around Lorsch Abbey, which itself were held by the Prince-Archbishopric of Mainz from the 13th century onwards. Upon the German mediatisation of 1803, the southern territories of the Landgraviate of Hesse-Darmstadt—including the former Mainz lands on the Bergstraße—were incorporated into the newly established Principality (from 1816: Province) of Starkenburg. Elevated to the Grand Duchy of Hesse in 1806, the possessions in Starkenburg, as well as in the provinces of Upper Hesse in the north and Rhenish Hesse in the west were confirmed by resolution of the 1815 Vienna Congress.

From 1832 the administration was subdivided into seven districts (kreise):
 Bensheim 
 Heppenheim, with the exclave of Wimpfen
both districts were merged into Bergstraße in 1938
 Erbach, renamed Odenwaldkreis in 1972
 Darmstadt, divided into an urban and a rural district in 1938
 Dieburg, merged with the Darmstadt rural district in 1977
 Groß-Gerau 
 Offenbach, from 1874 with the Upper Hessian exclave of Steinbach, divided into an urban and a rural district in 1938.
With the establishment of the present State of Hesse, Wimpfen and Steinbach were separated from the Starkenburg region; in turn, the Bischofsheim and Ginsheim-Gustavsburg quarters of the City of Mainz, located east of the Rhine River, passed to the Groß-Gerau district. A former administrative union of the Starkenburg districts was dissolved in 2007.

Economy
Today the Starkenburg Economic Development Agency run in cooperation with the Darmstadt chamber of commerce as a registered association coordinates the efforts of the government units in marketing the region to technology companies. Among the main issues are the development within the Frankfurt Rhine-Main metropolitan area and the construction of the Frankfurt–Mannheim high-speed railway.

Regions of Hesse
Grand Duchy of Hesse